Lac-Saint-Charles may refer to:
 Lac-Saint-Charles, Quebec City, a former city now part of Quebec City
 Le lac Saint-Charles, a lake close by Lac-Saint-Charles, Quebec City
 Lac-Saint-Charles–Saint-Émile, a district of Quebec City